Alian-e Sofla (also Romanized as ‘Alīān-e Soflá; also known as ‘Aleyān and ‘Alīān) is a village in Darmian Rural District, in the Central District of Darmian County, South Khorasan Province, Iran. At the 2006 census, its population was 30, in 7 families.

References 

Populated places in Darmian County